Gowri (also Romanized as Gowrī and Gūrī; also known as Kūrī) is a village in Dezh Gah Rural District, Dehram District, Farashband County, Fars Province, Iran. At the 2006 census, its population was 635, in 129 families.

References 

Populated places in Farashband County